Coop or Supermercados Fam Coop is a Puerto Rican supermarket chain. It has been operating since the 1960s.

History
During the 1970s. Supermercados COOP in Puerto Rico had a similar logo to that used by other COOP supermarkets around the world (two green trees inside a circle). There were locations at key Puerto Rican cities, including one at Santa Juanita, Bayamon, Plaza del Carmen Mall in Caguas, among others.

Subsequent years saw the demise of Grand Union, a chain with a large presence on the Puerto Rican market after being acquired in 1982 by Supermercados Amigo, later on, Supermercados COOP was acquired by Supermercados Amigo in 1983  and the increased competition caused Supermercados Amigo to close Supermercados COOP during the late 1980s. This allowed Supermercados Amigo, a nominally large supermarket chain until then, to expand across the country and rapidly become one of the major players in the Puerto Rican supermarket industry.

Brand return
During 2002, a new kind of supermarkets, named Fam-Coop, started opening across the tiny country. There are a number of them in places such as Bayamon, (Fam-Coop La Milagrosa, opened in 2010) Rincon, San Juan (also named Fam-Coop La Milagrosa-as there are two La Milagrosa neighborhoods in Puerto Rico, one in Bayamon and another in San Juan-and it  also opened in 2010) Isabela, Arecibo, (Mi Familia Fam Coop) and other towns.

See also
Coop (Switzerland)

External links

2010 establishments in Puerto Rico
Supermarkets of Puerto Rico
Puerto Rican brands